Anne François Augustin de La Bourdonnaye (18 July 1745 – 6 October 1793) briefly commanded three armies during the early years of the War of the First Coalition. An aristocrat, he joined the French Royal Army as a cadet during the Seven Years' War and fought at Villinghausen. He rose through the ranks until he became a maréchal de camp (brigadier general) in 1788 and a lieutenant general in 1792. During the Valmy Campaign he was responsible for defending the northeast frontier. He led the short-lived Army of the Interior in September 1792 before taking charge of the Army of the Coasts for two and a half months in early 1793. He transferred to the Pyrenees front and became the interim commander of the Army of the Western Pyrenees in July 1793 before becoming ill and dying a few months later.

References

Some of the content of this article comes from the equivalent French-language Wikipedia article (retrieved September 5, 2015).

French generals
French military personnel of the Seven Years' War
French Republican military leaders of the French Revolutionary Wars
Republican military leaders of the War in the Vendée
People from Loire-Atlantique
1745 births
1793 deaths